AFDA is a private Higher Education institution that offers courses in film, television, performance, business innovation and technology, radio and podcasting.  It has campuses located in Auckland Park, Johannesburg; Observatory, Cape Town; Durban North, Durban and Central, Port Elizabeth. It offers higher certificates, undergraduate degrees and postgraduate degrees. These include the following:

 Higher Certificate in Film, Television and Entertainment Production;
 Higher Certificate in Performing Arts;
 Higher Certificate in Radio and Podcasting;
 Bachelor of Arts (BA) in Motion Picture Medium;
 Bachelor of Arts (BA) in Live Performance;
 Bachelor of Commerce (Bcom) in Business Innovation and Entrepreneurship;
 Bachelor of Creative Writing;
 BA Honours in Motion Picture Medium;
 BA Honours in Live Performance;
 Postgraduate Diploma in Innovation; and 
 Master of Fine Arts (MFA).

International recognition
At the 33rd annual Student Academy Awards, in June 2006, the AFDA production Elalini, directed by Tristan Holmes, won the Honorary foreign award. In addition, Ongeriewe was nominated as a finalist in the Cour de Metrage professional short-film category at the Cannes Film Festival of 2006.
AFDA is a full member of CILECT (Centre International de Liaison de Ecoles de Cinema de Television). AFDA Co-founder and Chairman Mr. Garth Holmes is in his second 4-year term as President of the CILECT African Region (CARA).

Notable alumni
 Michelle Allen – actor, singer / songwriter 
 Munya Chidzonga – Zimbabwean actor, filmmaker, entrepreneur
 Shahir Chundra – actor and filmmaker
 Christopher-Lee Dos Santos – director
 Vuyo Dabula – actor
 Nosipho Dumisa – director and screenwriter
 Leroy Gopal – actor and comedian
 Kyle Louw – poet
 Daryne Joshua – filmmaker
 Jonathan Liebesman – director
 Eric Macheru – actor
 Khanya Mkangisa – actress
 Thapelo Mokoena – actor
 Preshanthan Moodley – director, producer, writer
 Jamie D. Ramsay – cinematographer
 Riky Rick – musician
 Shekhinah (singer) – singer
 Ofentse Mwase - Cinematographer, Director and Comedian

References

Sources
 SAQA
 
 News All : AFDA
 AFDA | Educartis Educartis. Retrieved 29 July 2018.

External links
 AFDA website

Film schools in South Africa
Educational institutions established in 1994
Mass media in Johannesburg
Mass media in Cape Town
1994 establishments in South Africa